This is a list of Chilean billionaires based on an annual assessment of wealth and assets compiled and published by Forbes magazine in 2021.

2021 Chilean billionaires list

See also 

 The World's Billionaires
 List of countries by the number of billionaires

References 

Chile
Net worth